Mitake (金峰) is a small community within Shūnan, Yamaguchi Prefecture. As of July 24, 2013, the community has 16 residents. It is located in a mountainous, remote area. The village had 10 households, a community center, and a temple.

In July 2013 the Yamaguchi arson and murders took place there. Five people, or about one-third of its population, died in the incident.

References

Further reading
 Nureki, T. 1967: Finding of axinite-schist in the Sangun metamorphic zone at Mitake, Yamaguchi prefecture, southwest Japan. Journal of Science, Hiroshima University. Series C, 5: 241-53.

Populated places in Yamaguchi Prefecture
Shūnan, Yamaguchi